Xeromammography is a photoelectric method of recording an x-ray image on a coated metal plate, using low-energy photon beams, long exposure time, and dry chemical developers.

It is a form of xeroradiography.

This process was developed in the late 1960s by Jerry Hedstrom, and used to image soft tissue, and later focused on using the process to detect breast cancer.

References

External links
A Demonstration of Xeromammography
"Xeromammography in the Early Detection of Breast Cancer"
JAMA - Xeromammography Abstract
Xeromammography's Lack of Efficacy
"Comparison of Xeromammography and Film Mammography in the Diagnosis of Breast Lesions"
Efficacy of Combined Film-Screem/Xeromammography
Single View Negative Mode Xeromammography

Radiography
Breast imaging